Henrietta High School is a public high school located in Henrietta, Texas, United States. It is the sole high school in the Henrietta Independent School District. In 2015, the school was rated "Met Standard" by the Texas Education Agency.

Athletics
The Henrietta Bearcats compete in the following sports:

Baseball
Basketball
Cross Country
Football
Golf
Powerlifting
Softball
Tennis
Track and Field
Volleyball

References

External links 
 Official website

Schools in Clay County, Texas
Public high schools in Texas